The Maeil Business Newspaper is South Korea's main daily business newspaper. , it had a circulation of roughly 900,000. The president of the publishing company is Chang Dae-hwan.

The publishing company Maekyung Media Group also hosts the annual World Knowledge Forum.

The first edition of the newspaper was published on March 24, 1966, and had 12 pages in its inaugural issue.

Political position 
Maeil Business Newspapers are generally moderate media, but many say they are close to pro-business conservatism. In particular, when major South Korean media are divided into the dichotomy of conservative and progressive-liberal, they are classified as clear conservative media.

Notes

Further reading

See also
Maeil Broadcasting Network

External links
Official website 
Official website 

Conservative media in South Korea
Korean-language newspapers
Newspapers published in South Korea